Caucauses is a misspelling and may refer to:
Caucasus, a geographic region
Caucuses, political events